Ann Warden Spencer, Lady Spencer (née Liddon; c. 1793 – 19 July 1855) was the daughter of Captain Matthew Liddon and Ann Warden. She was the wife of British Royal Navy Captain Sir Richard Spencer.

Early life
Ann's mother was the Lady of the Manor of Charmouth in Dorset who married Matthew Liddon on 22 June 1789 in the presence of her father, the ill-fated James Warden. They had at least five children, James (born 1790), Ann (1793), Sophia (1795), Lucy (1798) and Matthew (1800). The Liddons were an important family in Axminster, where they are shown as Farmers and Clothiers.

Marriage
At the time of Ann's marriage on 31 August 1812 to Captain Richard Spencer, a distinguished post captain in the Royal Navy, at St Matthew's Church, Charmouth, they were possibly living at Langmoor Manor. She was seventeen years old and Richard Spencer was thirty-three. Ann's marriage portion was £2,000, a sizeable sum for those days and when her husband died in 1839, this amount was still intact. Ann and Richard settled on a farm at Lyme Regis, Dorset, for seventeen years, during which nine of their ten children were born. Ann was to be one of the earliest emigrants to Australia when she left England in 1833 with her nine children. By then she was Lady Spencer and accompanying her husband Captain Sir Richard Spencer, he was taking up his appointment of Government Resident at Albany.

Later life
Ann's family lived at Strawberry Hill Farm in Albany. Of their daughters, Eliza Lucy was married to Sir George Grey, and Augusta was married to George Edward Egerton-Warburton, a pioneer settler near Mount Barker. Ann spent the remainder of her life in Western Australia, dying on 19 July 1855 at Perth.
Her remains were shipped to Albany for interment.

Notes

References
 John Marshall, Royal Naval Biography, London, 1829; p. 47
 Sophie C. Ducker editor, The contented botanist: letters of W.H. Harvey about Australia and the Pacific, Melbourne University Press at the Miegunyah Press, 1988;

External links
 History of Charmouth: The Liddon Family 1787-1853

1793 births
1855 deaths
People from Dorset
Wives of knights
19th-century English people
Settlers of Western Australia
English emigrants to Australia
19th-century Australian people
People from Albany, Western Australia
History of Western Australia
Women of the Victorian era